Æbleskiver ([singular: æbleskive]) are spherically-shaped Danish snacks made from fried batter. The name literally means "apple slices" in Danish, although apples are not usually an ingredient in present-day versions. The crust is similar in texture to European pancakes, but with a light and fluffy interior similar to a Yorkshire pudding. The English language spelling is usually aebleskiver, ebleskiver or ebelskiver.

Æbleskive pan

Æbleskiver are cooked on the stove top using a special pan with several hemispherical indentations. The pan exists in versions for gas and electrical stoves (the latter with a plain bottom). Pans are usually made of cast iron which has increased heat retention. Traditional models in hammered copper plate exist but are today used primarily for decoration.

Preparation

The batter for æbleskiver usually includes wheat flour, which is mixed with buttermilk, milk or cream, eggs, sugar, and a pinch of salt. Some recipes also include fat (usually butter), cardamom and lemon zest to improve taste, and a leavening agent, most often baking powder, but sometimes yeast, to aerate the batter.

Batter is poured into the oiled indentations and as the æbleskiver begin to cook, they are turned with a knitting needle, skewer or fork to give the cakes their characteristic spherical shape. They were traditionally cooked with bits of apple (æble) or applesauce inside but these ingredients are very rarely included in modern Danish forms of the dish. Æbleskiver are not sweet themselves but are traditionally served dipped in raspberry, strawberry, black currant or blackberry jam and sprinkled with powdered sugar. Butter, maple syrup, and whipped cream are also popular toppings.

Æbleskiver are often bought fried and frozen at supermarkets and then heated in the oven at home.

Traditions

In Denmark, æbleskiver are less common in restaurants than they are at casual family gatherings. They can also be found being sold by street vendors in the winter. They are traditionally served with jam and powdered sugar and three are placed on a plate at a time. They are traditionally eaten during the Christmas season and are often served with gløgg (Scandinavian mulled wine). They are often sold at Christmas markets, charity markets, open-air events, Scouting functions, local sports gatherings and similar venues. They are also served at children's birthday parties, due to their popularity and easy preparation. Voluntary associations gain profit from preparing them from the pre-fried, frozen stage and selling them, usually three at a time, with the usual condiments.

In North America there are several annual events that celebrate æbleskiver and Danish culture, with churches and museums holding "Æbleskiver Suppers" and similar events.

History 

The exact origin of æbleskiver is unknown. One popular speculation is that a band of Vikings were part of a difficult battle. When they returned to their ship, they wished to cook a meal similar to pancakes. However, since they lacked regular pans, they instead used their shields or helmets, resulting in a cake with a spherical shape.

According to another explanation, the custom of making a special sliced-apple dish originated in the Middle Ages when it was impossible to store raw apples beyond a certain date. The last apples of the year's harvest were sliced, used to flavor gløgg, scooped out of the gløgg, wrapped in dough, and fried in fat or butter like a Berliner. This is the origin of the name, which means "apple slices". In the 17th century, as cast iron pans with hemispherical concavities became available, æbleskiver could be easily made throughout the year, and the variety of fruit and other fillings expanded.

The first appearance of the word "æbleskiver" occurs in Peters Jul (1866), a book of Yule poems by Johan Krohn (1841–1925; son of Frederik Christopher Krohn and brother of Pietro Krohn). "Apple-filled æbleskiver" are also mentioned in the 1872 story "The Cripple" (Krøblingen) by Hans Christian Andersen.

In the United States, pans were manufactured by Griswold Manufacturing.

See also
 
 List of doughnut varieties
 
 
 , a similar Hong Kong dish.
 , similar Malaysian snack.
 , similar Indonesian snack.
 List of pancakes
 , the Norwegian version.
 , a similar dish from the south of India that comes in sweet and savoury varieties.
 , a similar Dutch dish that is sweet.
 
 , a savoury Japanese version that features octopus.
 , a similar dish from Kerala that is made in both sweet and spicy styles.

References

External links

 The Story of Aebleskiver (Solvang Restaurant, Solvang, California)
 Danish American Center, Minneapolis, Minnesota
 

Danish cuisine
Doughnuts
Pancakes
Wheat dishes